Gangs of Sonora is a 1941 American Western "Three Mesquiteers" B-movie directed by John English.

Cast
 Bob Livingston as Stony Brooke
 Bob Steele as Tucson Smith
 Rufe Davis as Lullaby Joslin
 June Johnson as June Conners
 Malcolm McTaggart as David Conners (as Ward 'Bud' McTaggart)
 Helen MacKellar as Kansas Kate Conners
 Robert Frazer as Commissioner Sam Tredwell
 William Farnum as Editor Ward Beecham
 Budd Buster as Jed Pickins
 Hal Price as Sheriff C. D. Lawson

References

External links

1941 films
1941 Western (genre) films
American Western (genre) films
American black-and-white films
Films directed by John English
Republic Pictures films
Three Mesquiteers films
1940s English-language films
1940s American films